The iRiver Spinn (stylised iriver SPINN) is a portable media player that was developed and sold by iRiver. It was announced at the 2008 Consumer Electronics Show and shipped later that year. It was a successor to the iRiver Clix 2.

Features

The Spinn is fully made of metal and features a resistive touchscreen AMOLED display along with an analogue wheel knob. Both the screen and the wheel have haptic feedback.

The Spinn has sound customisability in the SRS WOW HD 3D, as was seen previously on the iRiver Lplayer. Some features have been carried over including a voice recorder and Flash Lite games, but the Spinn also has Bluetooth. iRiver officially rates a 25 hour battery life for audio, or 5 hours for video.

In some regions such as the UK, it came with a DAB radio tuner.

Formats
It supports the audio formats MP3, WMA, Ogg, APE, ASF and FLAC, and videos in the formats MPEG 4 Simple Profile and WMV.

Interface
The iRiver Spinn's distinct feature is its user operability. It has a modern user interface that can be both operated by both the touchscreen or the physical analogue spindle, which is officially called the SPINN System (Analog Toggle Wheel). The wheel lets the user navigate left and right, and it can be clicked to select.

Reception
Trusted Reviews thought that the Spinn was "excellent and innovative", but that it could be niche in the market. The Register commented that it provides good sound quality as with previous iRiver players, but that it lacks in the video department and that the UI is "half-baked". The CNET review (with a score of 7 out of 10) liked the build quality, interface and support for audio codecs, but criticised the high price and the lack of certain features for the price. Engadget liked the "beautiful" hardware design, the display and the wheel, but did not like the high price and the software. In What Hi-Fi?'s review, the Spinn's design was praised but otherwise commented that for listening to music other products were better.

In South Korea, the Spinn failed to generate enough sales to recover against its rivals, Cowon and Samsung. IRiver did release another U device in 2011, the U100.

References

Portable media players
IRiver
Products introduced in 2008